Bathytoshia is a genus of stingrays in the family Dasyatidae found worldwide in tropical and warm temperate oceans (except the East Pacific and tropical Indian Ocean). It was formerly regarded as a junior synonym of the genus Dasyatis.

Species
Molecular phylogenetic data indicate that several previously recognized Dasyatis species are in fact populations of wider-ranging Bathytoshia species.
Bathytoshia brevicaudata (F. W. Hutton, 1875) (including Dasyatis matsubarai)
Bathytoshia centroura (Mitchill, 1815)
Bathytoshia lata (Garman, 1880) (including D. thetidis, D. ushiei, and eastern Atlantic B. centroura)

References

Dasyatidae